Psittacanthus angustifolius is a species of hemiparasitic plant in the family Loranthaceae found in Guatemala, Honduras and Mexico.

Destruction
In Mexico, the species was found on Pinus tecunumanii and Pinus oocarpa which were growing 4-km south of Jitotol, Chiapas.

References

Further reading

Flora of Central America
Taxa named by Job Kuijt
Flora of Mexico
angustifolius